Industrial University of Tyumen (IUT) (before 2016, known as the Tyumen State Oil and Gas University and the Tyumen State University of Architecture and Civil Engineering) is a higher education institution in Tyumen, Russia.

IUT provides education from secondary general, secondary vocational education, and higher education, to doctoral studies and business education programs.

Studies are held in 25 large groups of areas of training and specialties and in more than 150 educational programs. The number of students is approximately 32,530 people, including 1,500 international students from outside of Russia.

The IUT research group includes 225 higher doctorate and professors, and 787 candidates of sciences, associate professors. Among them there are 3 academicians, 4c corresponding members of the Russian Academy of Sciences and more than 100 full members and corresponding members of the academies of sciences, a Lenin Prize laureate, 3 State prize laureates, 7 Honoured master of sciences and engineering of the Russian Federation.

The rector of IUT is Veronika Efremova, as of 20 September 2020.

History 
The development of the Tyumen region and the development of the engineering industry required the training of highly qualified specialists.

In 1956, to solve this problem the regional government opened an educational and consulting center of the Ural Polytechnic Institute in the building of the Tyumen Machine-Building Technical School. Fedor Guriev, executive secretary of the regional society for the extension of political and scientific knowledge, became the head of the center.

In 1963, the Industrial Institute of Tyumen was established by the Government decree. The first rector of TII was Anatoly Kosukhin, who previously worked as an associate professor at the Ural Polytechnic Institute. In ten years, the student body grew from 750 in 1964 to 8,955 in 1974. During this period, student dormitories, a second educational building, an educational television center and a student research center were built, in addition to the regional administration allocating local apartments for the teaching staff.

In 1971, the construction faculty of the Industrial Institute of Tyumen became an independent higher educational institution – the Tyumen institute of civil engineering. In 1973, Viktor Kopylov became the rector of Industrial Institute of Tyumen. As rector he paid particular attention to the recruitment of scientific and pedagogical personnel. In the mid-70s, 30 doctors of sciences, professors, about 200 candidates of sciences, associate professors worked at IIT. In 1986, Valentin Kanalin was appointed as rector. During this period, educational, scientific and industrial complexes with multi-storey buildings were built, as well as further residential buildings for teachers and staff. In 1990, Nikolai Karnaukhov was appointed as rector of Industrial Institute of Tyumen.

In 1994, IIT changed its name to Tyumen State Oil and Gas University. In the year of the institution's 50th anniversary, about 50 thousand people studied at the university in 650 general education programs. Over this time, the University has graduated about 75 thousand specialists. At that time, the structure of the university had 6 educational institutes, 18 branches (3 of which had the status of an Institute), 10 divisions of elementary and secondary vocational education.

In 2003, the University introduced a quality management system (QMS) for compliance with international educational standards. Since June 2007, graduates and teachers of the University have had the opportunity to obtain the European Diploma Supplement.

On 31 March 2010, at the Conference of scientific and pedagogical workers and students of the university, Vladimir Novoselov was elected as a new rector of the University. At that time, the University included 10 educational institutions in Tyumen, 16 branches, 3 colleges, a general education lyceum, and the student body numbered 60 thousand. The faculty consisted of 1100 candidates and doctors of sciences, with three full members and two corresponding members of the RAS. The structure of the University included 17 research institutes and the field Subarctic research facility. In 2015,  the University of Architecture and Civil Engineering became a structural unit of the Tyumen State Oil and Gas University.

On 25 March 2016, by the decree of the Ministry of Education and Science of the Russian Federation, Tyumen State Oil and Gas University was renamed into Industrial University of Tyumen.

In May 2017 Veronika Efremova, a candidate of economic sciences, associate professor, was appointed as acting rector, a position she formally accepted as a permanent role in September 2019. In 2018, the University launched the educational project "Higher School of Engineering EG", which trains new-breed engineers in the area of digital transformation of the region.

Today 35,000 students study at the University at all levels of education. IUT offers 36 areas of training in higher education programs (bachelor's, specialist's degree), 31 Master's programs, 37 intermediate vocational education programs, 14 training programs for blue-collar professions and 8 areas of study in postgraduate programs.

In total, the university has trained over 230 thousand specialists. Among the graduates are politicians, ministers, governors, heads of oil and gas and construction companies in Russia, specialists in the fuel and energy complex,  in industrial and civil construction, and famous athletes.

The university has long-term partnerships with major oil and gas companies such as Surgutneftegas, Lukoil, Transneft, Gazprom, Rosneft, Repsol, with over 190 partnership agreements.

Rectors 
 1964–1973 – Anatoly Kosukhin
 1973–1986 – Viktor Kopylov
 1986–1990 – Valentin Kanalin
 1990–2010 – Nikolai Karnaukhov
 2010–2015 – Vladimir Novoselov
 2015–2017 – Oleg Novoselov
 2017–present – Veronika Efremova

Extracurricular activities 
The university has a joint student council (OSSO). Members of the OSSO take part in the meetings of the academic council and the rectorate. They are members of the commissions that work on the creation of local regulatory legal acts. The Council includes more than 20 public associations of social, scientific and military-patriotic orientation. In 2008, the IUT joint student council had become the best student council in the Tyumen region.

The United Primary Trade union Organization (OPPO) is a voluntary public association of citizens bound by common interests by the nature of their activities, created for their representation and protection of social and labor rights.

The university has clubs and organizations of interest:

 International club – the inclusion of foreign students in the social, creative, scientific and sports life of the university;
 Intellectual club – popularization of the student intellectual movement;
 Tyumen branch of the Unternational student society of petroleum engineers at IUT (SPE);
 Military-patriotic association "Barsy Neftegaza";
 StudInformBuro – a community of non-professional journalists;
 Engineering and design bureau "Formula Neftegaz";
 Student sports club "Neft" and much more.

International activity 
For more than 40 years, the Tyumen Industrial University has been engaged in international activities in the following areas:

 Training of highly qualified specialists for foreign countries;
 Business trips of the teaching staff for internships at foreign universities and companies;
 Student's participation in academic mobility programs;
 Enhancing of international network cooperation.

Since 1978, the University has been training specialists for foreign countries (mainly Mongolia and Bulgaria). Teachers of the University took part in training the engineering personnel for Algeria as the Algerian national institute of oil, gas and chemistry has a long history of a partnership with the IUT.

Since the 2000s, there has been an active internationalization of the university's activities. During this time, the geography of international partners has expanded significantly: today Industrial University of Tyumen has more than 50 cooperation agreements with universities in China, Vietnam, Germany, Slovenia, Finland, Great Britain, Latvia, Czech Republic, Austria, Indonesia, Philippines, India, Bulgaria, Kazakhstan, Armenia and others. IUT's partners are large international companies such as Schlumberger, Baker Hughes, Halliburton, CCA Deutag Drilling, Bentec, Weatherford, The Cuba Oil Union (CUPET) and others.

The university is a member of international consortiums: the University of the Arctic (UArctic), the Russian-Kyrgyz Consortium of Technical Universities (RKKTU), the Association of Technical Universities of Russia and China (ASRTU), the Worldwide Energy University Network (WEUN).

To implement international agreement and network cooperation, the university carries on academic mobility of teaching staff and students, international educational projects and scientific cooperation, Double degree programs, joint educational programs, including summer school programs, introductory trainings and joint workshops.

Over the past ten years, the contingent of foreign students has expanded to 1,500 people. Due to participation in International educational exhibitions, enhancing interaction with recruiting companies, foreign schools, educational centers and cooperation with representatives of Rossotrudnichestvo abroad, the geography of foreign students at IUT has reached 41 countries. Right now, it covers the CIS, Asia, Europe, the Middle East, Africa and Latin America.

To teach foreign citizens the Russian language, the IUT implements an additional general education program "Pre-university courses for foreign students". Every year about 50 students from Africa, Latin America, Asia and the Middle East study at this program.

Since 2017, Industrial University of Tyumen has been teaching master's programs in English:

•    Offshore drilling

•    Geosteering

•    Logistics and supply chain management

•    Advertising media business

To help foreign students to better integrate into the scientific, educational and cultural life, the University has an IUT Interclub, which unites foreign and Russian students and provides opportunities for self-realization and participation in university projects, both Russian and International.

Interclub several times became the winner and award holder of all-Russian competitions in the nominations "The best project aimed at strengthening friendship between the peoples of Russia", "The best work with foreign students", "The best model of student clubs", "The best project in the field of international student cooperation and work with foreign students ", etc.

One of the examples of an initiative to develop intercultural dialogue is Generation without borders, the international festival of youth and students. It's been held at IUT for twelve years and has already become a kind of visiting card of the University.

The main goal of the event is to create conditions for the development of interethnic and interregional relationships and educate the younger generation in the spirit of patriotism, tolerance and solidarity.

Every year, up to 500 people take part in the festival, including teachers and students of schools, universities, technical schools, as well as representatives of regional national associations, government, international companies, embassies and consulates.

Ratings 

 Ranked 71st among the best universities in Russia (2020) according to research by the Expert RA rating agency
 National University Ranking Interfax – 78 position (2020)
 In the first ranking of the best universities in Russia, according to Forbes, it is ranked 57th (2020)
 In the top 100 Best universities in Russia in the field of Technical, natural sciences and exact sciences – 39 position (2020)
 In the International professional ranking of universities RankPro 2019–2020, the IUT is included in the group of 700+ universities
 Included in the ranking of universities in developing countries in Europe and Central Asia QS University rankings: Emerging Europe & Central Asia, ranked 301–350 (2020)
 In 2019 was included in the QS University rankings: BRICS, group 351–400
 In the Moscow international ranking of universities "Three missions of the university" (2020) ranked in the group 1101–1200

Organization structure

Institutes 

 Institute of industrial technologies and engineering
 Higher school of engineering EG
 Institute of architecture and design
 Institute of transport
 Institute of service and industry management
 Institute of geology and oil and gas production
 Institute of extended and distance education

Branches 

 IUT branch in Nizhnevartovsk
 Noyabrsk Institute of Oil and Gas
 Surgut Institute of Oil and Gas
 Tobolsk Industrial Institute

Colleges 

 IUT Multidisciplinary College

Lyceums 
 IUT Lyceum

Notes

Literature 

 The university is strong by its graduates: dedicated to the 35th anniversary of TSOGU (IIT). Tyumen, 1998, p. 164
 University, oil and people: the 30th anniversary of the Tyumen Industrial Institute. Tyumen, 1993, p. 239
 Ivantsova G.I. Construction projects of a complex of buildings IIT – TSOGU // Revival of the historical center of Tyumen. Tyumen in the past, present and future. Abstracts and messages of the scientific-practical conference. Tyumen, 2002, p. 32–35.
 Kovensky I.M., Kopylov V.E., Skifsky S.V. To the history of relations between the Tyumen State Oil and Gas University (Industrial institute) and the institutes of the SB RAS // Science of Tyumen at the turn of the century. Tyumen, 1999, p. 182–188.
 Kopylov V.E. The first rector of the "Industrial' // Kopylov V.E. The call of memory (History of the Tyumen region through the eyes of an engineer). Book two. Tyumen, 2001, p. 198-204.
 Chronicle of the Tyumen State Oil and Gas University: Vol. 1–5. Tyumen, 1998–2002.
 The "Neftegaz" deposit: encyclopedia of graduates of TSOGU. Tyumen, 2003, p. 488.
 From Institute to University: dedicated to the 35th anniversary of the Tyumen State Oil and Gas University. Tyumen, 1998, p. 197

References 
 Official site of Industrial University of Tyumen
Vkontakte
Instagram

Educational institutions established in 1956
Buildings and structures in Tyumen
Education in Tyumen Oblast
Universities in Russia
Universities and institutes established in the Soviet Union
Energy education
1956 establishments in the Soviet Union